Allochromatium renukae is a Gram-negative and phototrophic bacterium from the genus of Allochromatium which has been isolated from brackish water from Chollangi in India.

References 

Chromatiales
Bacteria described in 2008